Tirumani is a suburb of Chennai located south of Chengalpattu.

According to Census 2011 information the location code or village code of Thirumani village is 629867. Thirumani village is located in Tirukalukundram Tehsil of Kancheepuram district in Tamil Nadu, India. Chengalpattu district and Tirukalukundram are the district & sub-district headquarters of Thirumani village respectively. As per 2009 stats, Thirumani village is also a gram panchayat.

Thirumani has a total population of 3,362 peoples. There are about 854 houses in Thirumani village.

Government Primary school is located in this village and about 50 students are studying as of 2017.

Villages in Chengalpattu district